Michata is a village in the municipal unit of Omala on the island of Kefalonia, Greece. It is situated on a hillside at the western foot of Mount Ainos. It is 1 km north of Epanochori, 1 km southeast of Valsamata and 10 km east of Argostoli. The village was severely damaged by the 1953 Ionian earthquake.

Historical population

See also

List of settlements in Cephalonia

References

Populated places in Cephalonia